Gallivirus is a genus of viruses in the order Picornavirales, in the family Picornaviridae. Turkey and chicken serve as natural hosts. There is only one species in this genus: Gallivirus A.

Structure
Viruses in Gallivirus are non-enveloped, with icosahedral and spherical geometries, and T=pseudo3 symmetry. The diameter is around 30 nm. Genomes are linear and non-segmented, around 8.5kb in length.

Life cycle
Viral replication is cytoplasmic. Entry into the host cell is achieved by attachment of the virus to host receptors, which mediates endocytosis. Replication follows the positive stranded RNA virus replication model. Positive stranded RNA virus transcription is the method of transcription. The virus exits the host cell by lysis, and viroporins. Turkey and chicken serve as the natural host.

References

External links
 Viralzone: Gallivirus
 ICTV

Picornaviridae
Virus genera